Crinotarsini is a tribe of longhorn beetles of the subfamily Lamiinae. It was described by Lacordaire in 1872.

Genera
The tribe includes the following genera:

 Crinotarsus Blanchard, 1853
 Sormida Gahan, 1888

References

Lamiinae